Scream and Light Up the Sky is the second and final studio album from indie rock band The Honorary Title.  It was released in association with Doghouse Records and Reprise Records on August 28, 2007.  The album was produced by Rob Schnapf with the exception of the track "Stuck at Sea," which was produced by Butch Walker. The album title is taken from the song "The City's Summer".

Track listing

References

2007 albums
The Honorary Title albums
Albums produced by Rob Schnapf